The General Confederation of the Workers of Benin (CGTB) is a trade union centre in Benin. It is affiliated with the International Trade Union Confederation.

See also

 Trade unions in Benin

References

Trade unions in Benin
International Trade Union Confederation